Fox dog is a name given by some naturalists to wild dogs of South America with a fox-like appearance. Among them are:

 Atelocynus microtis (the short-eared dog of Brazil)
 Cerdocyon thous azarae (zono, or Azara's dog; a variety of the crab-eating fox)
 Lycalopex vetulus (the hoary fox of Brazil)

Animal common name disambiguation pages